Valeriano Riera (15 April 1899 – 16 January 1949) was a Spanish racing cyclist. He competed in the 1930 Tour de France.

References

External links
 

1899 births
1949 deaths
Spanish male cyclists
Place of birth missing
Sportspeople from the Province of Huesca
Cyclists from Aragon